Mario Marceé West (born June 19, 1984) is an American former professional basketball player who is currently the Director of Off the Court for the NBPA. He previously played in the NBA for the Atlanta Hawks and New Jersey Nets.

High school and college career
West was a Douglas County player of the year as a senior at Douglas County High School. He also earned honorable mention all-state honors after averaging 22 points and 10 rebounds per game. West was team captain as a junior and senior.

West played college basketball for Georgia Tech. He joined the Tech squad as a walk-on in the fall of 2002, redshirted in 2002–03, and earned a scholarship for the 2003–04 season. He played in 103 games, averaging 3.2 points over his career, and 4.9 over his last two seasons. West departed Georgia Tech 16th on the school's all-time list for steals despite averaging only 13.9 minutes per game in four years. He was voted team captain during the 2006–07 season. West won the 2007 NCAA State Farm Slam Dunk Contest held during the tournament's Final Four week.

West received a Bachelor of Science degree in management from Georgia Tech on May 6, 2006, and continued his studies during his final college basketball season with courses in Economics.

Professional career
West went undrafted in the 2007 NBA draft but was quickly signed by the Atlanta Hawks, a team he spent his first two seasons with. West spent the first half of the 2009–10 season playing in the NBA Development League for the Maine Red Claws, before re-joining the Hawks in January 2010. He remained with the Hawks for the rest of the season, and in 156 games for the team over three seasons, he averaged 0.8 points in 4.4 minutes per game.

West was known as a hard worker and an intense defender.  Atlanta Hawks Head Coach Mike Woodson was quoted as saying "I've been around this league a long time and I don't think I've ever seen a guy play as hard as Mario plays.  He pushes guys in practice to play hard and if you don't play hard he embarrasses you in terms of just knocking the hell out of you." Teammate Acie Law said "You can ask anybody in this locker room, Mario's the hardest worker on the team. You have to be at practice to see him. His motor never stops."

West re-joined the Maine Red Claws for the 2010–11 season, later signing with the New Jersey Nets in March 2011. He appeared in six games for the Nets to complete the 2010–11 season, averaging 3.7 points, 1.8 rebounds, 1.7 assists and 1.2 steals in 19.3 minutes per game.

In June 2011, West joined Cocolos de San Pedro de Macorís of the Liga Nacional de Baloncesto. His stint lasted until early August.

On August 2, 2011, West signed with Tezenis Verona of Italy for the 2011–12 season.

In June 2012, West moved to the Philippines where he joined the Meralco Bolts. In September 2012, he joined Cañeros del Este and helped them win the league championship while garnering Finals MVP honors in early October. Later that month, he joined La Villa for a short stint.

In January 2013, West signed with Fuerza Regia of Mexico for the rest of the 2012–13 season. In June 2013, he re-joined the Meralco Bolts. He then returned to Fuerza Regia for the 2013–14 season. In March 2014, he moved to France and signed with SO Maritime Boulogne. In May 2014, he returned the Meralco Bolts for a third stint.

In October 2014, West signed with La Unión of Argentina for the 2014–15 season. He sustained an injury in February 2015 and was ruled out for the rest of the season. He remained in Argentina for the 2015–16 season, signing with Juventud Sionista.

In May 2016, West returned to Georgia Tech in Atlanta when he was hired as the director of player personnel as part of head coach Josh Pastner's staff.

NBA career statistics

Regular season

|-
| align="left" | 
| align="left" | Atlanta
| 64 || 2 || 4.2 || .429 || .000 || .654 || .8 || .2 || .2 || .1 || .9
|-
| align="left" | 
| align="left" | Atlanta
| 53 || 3 || 5.1 || .412 || 1.000 || .467 || 1.1 || .4 || .3 || .1 || .8
|-
| align="left" | 
| align="left" | Atlanta
| 39 || 1 || 3.6 || .571 || .000 || .600 || .7 || .2 || .2 || .0 || .8
|-
| align="left" | 
| align="left" | New Jersey
| 6 || 3 || 19.3 || .429 || .250 || .600 || 1.8 || 1.7 || 1.2 || .0 || 3.7
|-
| style="text-align:center;" colspan="2"| Career
| 162 || 9 || 4.9 || .448 || .200 || .563 || .9 || .3 || .3 || .0 || 1.0

Playoffs

|-
| align="left" | 2008
| align="left" | Atlanta
| 6 || 0 || 1.0 || .333 || .000 || .000 || .3 || .0 || .0 || .0 || .3
|-
| align="left" | 2009
| align="left" | Atlanta
| 11 || 0 || 4.2 || .200 || .000 || .250 || .5 || .2 || .2 || .0 || .5
|-
| align="left" | 2010
| align="left" | Atlanta
| 7 || 0 || 2.9 || .750 || .000 || .000 || .3 || .1 || .1 || .0 || .9
|-
| style="text-align:center;" colspan="2"| Career
| 24 || 0 || 3.0 || .353 || .000 || .200 || .4 || .1 || .1 || .0 || .5

Personal life
West is the son of Gerald and Angie West.

He has volunteered to work with patients at Egleston Children's Hospital in Atlanta since his college days in 2004. This includes activities such as hosting pizza parties for the children.

West co-authored a book "Defend the Dream" with his childhood friend Shakyna Bolden.  He shares the lessons he learned in dealing with the challenges of life.

References

External links

NBA.com profile
Georgia Tech Yellow Jackets bio

1984 births
Living people
American expatriate basketball people in Argentina
American expatriate basketball people in the Dominican Republic
American expatriate basketball people in France
American expatriate basketball people in Italy
American expatriate basketball people in Mexico
American expatriate basketball people in the Philippines
American men's basketball players
Atlanta Hawks players
Basketball players from Alabama
Big3 players
Fuerza Regia de Monterrey players
Georgia Tech Yellow Jackets men's basketball players
Juventud Sionista basketball players
La Unión basketball players
Maine Red Claws players
Meralco Bolts players
New Jersey Nets players
People from Douglasville, Georgia
Philippine Basketball Association imports
Scaligera Basket Verona players
Shooting guards
SOMB Boulogne-sur-Mer players
Sportspeople from the Atlanta metropolitan area
Sportspeople from Huntsville, Alabama
Undrafted National Basketball Association players
American men's 3x3 basketball players